Aeranthes, abbreviated Aerth in the horticultural trade, is an orchid genus with 47 species, mostly from shady, tropical humid forests in Zimbabwe, Madagascar and islands in the Western Indian Ocean. The name "aeranthes" means 'aerial flower', because it grows high in the air.

Description
Aeranthes has a single short, erect, monopodial stem. The leathery, shining, opposite leaves are arranged in two rows of five to seven leaves, with a length of 15–25 cm. New leaves are formed at the top of the stem in a monopodial growth pattern.

The threadlike flower stalk grows downward to a length of almost 30 cm. It carries one or two almost translucent, greenish yellow flowers. The sepals and the shorter petals taper off into five long, narrow shoots. Some give an agreeable, sweet scent in the evening or early morning.

References

External links
 
 

 
Orchids of Africa
Vandeae genera
Flora of Madagascar
Flora of the Comoros
Orchids of Mauritius
Flora of Réunion
Flora of Zimbabwe